Reon Dane King (born 6 October 1975) is a former West Indian cricketer who has played 19 Test matches and 50 One Day Internationals for the West Indies.

An athletic paceman from Guyana with a slinky run sometimes compared to Michael Holding's, King bowls through that run rather than setting himself at the crease, but was still considered to be West Indies' fastest bowler at the end of the 1990s.

Personal life 
He was born in Goed Fortuin, but grew up in Newtown Kitty. He attended St Joseph's High School where he was encouraged to join the GCC. King made his Under-19 debut for Guyana in the 1993 Northern Telecom Regional Youth Championship.

In 2007 he began coaching cricket.

He manages Genesis Fitness Gym, which is owned by his wife.

International career
He enjoyed a successful home season in 1999–2000, taking his first Test five-for against Zimbabwe in Jamaica. Two months later, after setting up a tight win over Pakistan, he and Franklyn Rose seemed almost ready to succeed Curtly Ambrose and Courtney Walsh. But both fell away during the 2000 tour of England, where King was said to be troubled by a heel injury. An introverted character and a genuine No. 10, King was a forgotten man for four years, until he was recalled for the home series against South Africa in 2004–05, when a raft of leading players were sidelined by a contract dispute.

King was a strong performer in ODIs, rising to fourth in the ICC Rankings in 2000 and finishing with 76 wickets at 23.77, the fourth lowest ODI bowling average by a West Indian after Joel Garner (18.84), Colin Croft (20.35) and Michael Holding (21.36). His performances went unnoticed by the selectors, who picked him for just two games after 2001.

References

1975 births
Living people
Cricketers at the 1999 Cricket World Cup
Durham cricketers
Guyanese cricketers
Northerns cricketers
West Indies One Day International cricketers
West Indies Test cricketers
Guyanese expatriates in South Africa
Marylebone Cricket Club cricketers
Guyana cricketers